Alejandro Martínez Fernández (September 28, 1991 in Palma, Majorca, Spain) better known as Álex Martínez is a Spanish actor. He is best known for his roles of Salvador “Salva” Quintanilla in the Antena 3 Teen drama series Física o Química and Boabdil of Granada in the historical fiction series of Televisión Española Isabel.

Filmography

Television

Movies

Theater

References

External links 

 
 Kailash Agency
 Website

1991 births
Living people
Spanish male film actors
21st-century Spanish male actors